Palayam is a village in Kanyakumari district in the Indian state of Tamil Nadu. It was formerly in Kerala.

Demographics
As of the 2001 Indian census, Palayam had a population of 14,096. 51% of the population is male and 49% is female. The average literacy rate in Palayam is 45%, lower than the national average of 59.5%: male literacy is 55%, and female literacy is 35%. In addition, 12% of the population in Palayam is under 6 years of age.

References

Cities and towns in Dindigul district